Aldisa banyulensis is a species of sea slug, a dorid nudibranch, a marine gastropod mollusk in the family Cadlinidae.

Distribution
This species was described from Banyuls-sur-Mer, France. It is also reported from the Mediterranean coast of Spain.

Description
Aldisa banyulensis is a small sea slug that is normally 8–12 mm in length. It is red or orange-red in colour with two oval markings on the midline of the back which resemble the inhalent pore-sieves of its sponge food. There are pale streaks running from the sides of the back to the edge of the mantle and between the rhinophores.

Ecology
This species is reported to feed on the sponge Hemimycale columella (Hymedesmiidae).

References

Cadlinidae
Gastropods described in 1951
Taxa named by Alice Pruvot-Fol